Baraka "Al Yamaniyah" (died 22 August 2018) was a concubine of King Abdulaziz of Saudi Arabia and the mother of Muqrin bin Abdulaziz, former crown prince of Saudi Arabia. 

She was a Yemeni. She died on 22 August 2018. Funeral prayers were performed the Imam Turki bin Abdullah Mosque in Riyadh.

References

20th-century slaves
Baraka
Baraka
2018 deaths
Arabian slaves and freedmen
Baraka
Baraka
Year of birth missing
Slave concubines